Aayushkalam is a 1992 Indian Malayalam-language  ghost film directed by Kamal and written by Vinu Kiriyath and Rajan Kiriyath. It stars Mukesh and Jayaram in the lead roles and Sreenivasan, Sai Kumar and Gavin Packard in supporting roles. The film was a commercial success at the box office. Aayushkalam is based on the Hollywood films Ghost and Heart Condition and was in turn remade in Hindi as Hello Brother.

Plot

Balakrishnan (Mukesh) is a heart patient, yet he drinks and smokes a lot. He works in a bank. He urgently needs a heart transplant, for which he is unlikely to receive a heart and has given up all hope of living any longer. Surprisingly and luckily he receives the heart of Aby Mathew (Jayaram), a youth who has died in a car accident. The surgery is performed after both families agree to it. Gradually, Balakrishnan recovers from the surgery. Soon after he is discharged from the hospital, he visits the doctor and asks him who gave him the heart out of curiosity. Although initially reluctant, the doctor gives him the newspaper report about Aby's death which contains his photograph.

While leaving the hospital, Balakrishnan is frightened to see Aby's ghost and he is unable to escape from Aby's hold as he is able to follow him everywhere. Eventually, Aby starts following Balakrishnan at work, the restaurant, hospital and even at home, where he is initially not allowed to enter by the ghost of Balakrishnan's late father Gopala Menon (Innocent), who is miserable because he cannot communicate with anyone but ghosts. Balakrishnan tries various methods to drive Aby's ghost out of the house, but all fail and makes everyone believe he has gone crazy. He especially has trouble because Aby is invisible to everyone but himself, and hilarity ensues.

Aby tells Balakrishnan that he was in fact murdered very unexpectedly on a busy road, by a man whom he could not identify, initially using a gun, but he was later run over by the vehicle while he was leaving to see his newborn child. Balakrishnan visits Aby's family- his mother (Kaviyoor Ponnamma) and wife Shobha (Maathu) with Aby's ghost.

Damu (Sreenivasan), a police Sub-Inspector, arrests Balakrishnan believing he is a flirt due to Aby's invisibility. He does not believe Balakrishnan when he talks about Aby's ghost and punishes him even more instead. However, Aby plays a trick on him to make him believe it by visiting his house and he reluctantly does. The character Damu causes significant hilarity at this point, especially because he appears foolish and naive but shows off as though he is a wise and experienced policeman.

As it proceeds towards the climax, the film takes a serious turn. With the help of Inspector Damu, Balakrishnan discovers that Aby Mathew was murdered by a notorious criminal named Benjamin Bruno (Gavin Packard). However, Bruno refuses to tell the truth and escapes from prison by acting as though he has fainted. However, Aby follows him and hears him talking on the phone to a mysterious person. Aby sees Alex, his adopted brother, talking to Bruno about his murder and that it needs to be covered up. Aby realises that Alex  hired Bruno to kill Aby and to take over his businesses which he had inherited from their father. Alex murders Bruno fearing that the truth would come out soon. Aby informs Balakrishnan about the matter.

Balakrishnan approaches Aby's family, who initially refuse to believe it. However, he tells them about Aby's ghost and they do so. The film proceeds to the next scene where Inspector Damu refuses to help them anymore, as he fears he could get transferred anytime for believing in ghosts.

As the story proceeds to the climax, Alex forces Shobha and Aby's mother to sign certain documents that make him the owner of all the businesses and assets that Aby had inherited from his father. He kidnaps Balakrishnan and threatens to destroy Aby's heart if they did not sign the documents. Aby decides to save them. He enters Inspector Damu's house and possesses his body. He fights with Alex and kills him. Alex's ghost rises and both face each other, but soon Alex is sent to hell. Balakrishnan and Aby try to communicate with each other, but they no longer can do so. In the end, a divine light appears from the sky and transports Aby to heaven.

Cast

 Mukesh as Balakrishnan
 Jayaram as Aby Mathew    
 Sreenivasan as SI Damodaran Nair
 Sai Kumar as Alex Chandanavelil
 Maathu as Shobha
 Rudra as Sujatha
 Kaviyoor Ponnamma as Aby's Mother
 Innocent as Gopala Menon
 Oduvil Unnikrishnan as Menon
 Gavin Packard as Benjamin Bruno
 Siddique as Dr. Hariprasad 
 Mamukkoya as Varghese
 Sankaradi as Fernandez
 Alummoodan as Velu Mooppan
 Idavela Babu as Gopi
 K. P. A. C. Lalitha as  Dakshayani
 Zeenath as Geetha
 James as Auto-Rikshaw driver
 N. F. Varghese as Police Officer
 T. P. Madhavan as Police Officer 
 Abu Salim as Peter

Soundtrack
The music was composed by Ouseppachan. "Mounam Swaramaayi"'s tune was reused in the song "Chitti Kuruvi" in the 2003 film Mullavalliyum Thenmavum, also composed by Ouseppachan, but the song is a bit western, starting from a hum by Unni Menon and Sujatha Mohan, both songs are in Kalyani (raga).

References

External links
 

1992 films
Indian remakes of American films
1990s Malayalam-language films
1990s fantasy comedy films
1990s psychological thriller films
Indian fantasy comedy films
Indian ghost films
Films directed by Kamal (director)
Films scored by Ouseppachan
Malayalam films remade in other languages
Indian psychological thriller films